is a Japanese actor and voice actor from Tokyo. He is the best known official dubbing roles for Benedict Cumberbatch, especially in Doctor Strange and Avengers film series.

Filmography

Television dramas
Bakuryū Sentai Abaranger (2003)
Aibō (2006)
Engine Sentai Go-onger (2008)
Doubutsu Sentai Zyuohger (2016)

Television animation
Jewelpet (2009) – Takeo Nanase
Giant Killing (2010) – Sumita
Lupin III: the Last Job (2010) – Detective Leone
Rozen Maiden (2013) – Laplace's Demon
Samurai Flamenco (2013) – Akira Konno
Durarara!!x2 (2015) – Sloan
Gangsta. (2015) – Theo
91 Days (2016) – Testa Lagusa
Black Clover (2018) - Fanzell Kruger
Zoids Wild Zero (2019) – Dias
86 (2021) – Jerome Carlstahl
Battle Athletes Victory ReSTART! (2021) – Jefferson Natdhipytadd
Peach Boy Riverside (2021) – Kyūketsuki
The Night Beyond the Tricornered Window (2021) – Hiroki Hanzawa
Akebi's Sailor Uniform (2022) – Sato Akebi
Delicious Party PreCure (2022) – Fennel/Godatz
Requiem of the Rose King (2022) – Earl of Warwick

Theatrical animation
Genocidal Organ (2017) – Williams

Video games
Metal Gear Solid V: The Phantom Pain (2015) – Ocelot
Watch Dogs (2014, Japanese dub) – Damien
Dissidia Final Fantasy NT (2018) – Kam'lanaut
Death Stranding (2019) – Higgs
Nioh 2 (2020) – Akechi Mitsuhide
Saint Seiya Awakening (2020) – Thanatos
Tactics Ogre: Reborn (2022) – Lanselot Tartaros
Fate/Grand Order (2023) – Tezcatlipoca

Dubbing

Live-action
Benedict Cumberbatch
Marple: Murder Is Easy – Luke Fitzwilliam
Sherlock – Sherlock Holmes
Third Star – James
Wreckers – David
Parade's End – Christopher Tietjens
August: Osage County – "Little" Charles Aiken
Star Trek Into Darkness – Khan
The Imitation Game – Alan Turing
Black Mass – William "Billy" Bulger
Zoolander 2 – All
Doctor Strange – Dr. Stephen Strange
Thor: Ragnarok – Dr. Stephen Strange
The Child in Time – Stephen Lewis
Avengers: Infinity War – Dr. Stephen Strange
Patrick Melrose – Patrick Melrose
Avengers: Endgame – Dr. Stephen Strange
Between Two Ferns: The Movie – Benedict Cumberbatch
1917 – Colonel Mackenzie
The Current War – Thomas Edison
The Power of the Dog – Phil Burbank
Spider-Man: No Way Home – Dr. Stephen Strange
Doctor Strange in the Multiverse of Madness – Dr. Stephen Strange
90210 – Oscar (Blair Redford)
All Roads Lead to Rome – Luca (Raoul Bova)
American Heist – Ray (Tory Kittles)
Amsterdam – Tom Voze (Rami Malek)
Another Life – Erik Wallace (Justin Chatwin)
Avengers Grimm – Rumpelstiltskin (Casper Van Dien)
Bad Guy – Lee Beom-woo (Ji Hoo)
Barefoot in the Park (Netflix edition) – Paul Bratter (Robert Redford)
Blackway – Blackway (Ray Liotta)
Colt 45 – Luc Denard (Simon Abkarian)
A Dangerous Man – Chen (Terry Chen)
Dark Skies – Daniel Barrett (Josh Hamilton)
Downton Abbey – Thomas Barrow (Rob James-Collier)
Eureka – Dr. Trevor Grant (James Callis)
Fargo – Emmit Stussy and Raymond "Ray" Stussy (Ewan McGregor)
Final Approach – Jack Bender (Dean Cain)
The Finest Hours – Daniel Cluff (Eric Bana)
The Games Maker – Morodian (Joseph Fiennes)
The Girl with All the Gifts – Sergeant Eddie Parks (Paddy Considine)
Gogol. The Beginning – Investigator Yakov Petrovich Guro (Oleg Menshikov)
Gogol. Terrible Revenge – Investigator Yakov Petrovich Guro (Oleg Menshikov)
Hard Kill – Derek Miller (Jesse Metcalfe)
Hitchcock – Lew Wasserman (Michael Stuhlbarg)
The Hot Zone – Trevor Rhodes (James D'Arcy)
Ice Twisters – Frank (Robert Moloney)
I Love You, Man – Tevin Downey (Rob Huebel)
Irrational Man – Professor Abe Lucas (Joaquin Phoenix)
The Last Rescue – Captain Beckett (Brett Cullen)
Legend – Albert Donoghue (Paul Anderson)
Mad Dogs – Joel (Ben Chaplin)
The Magnificent Seven – Joshua Faraday (Chris Pratt)
Métal Hurlant Chronicles – Joe Manda (Scott Adkins)
Narcos: Mexico – Jaime Kuykendall (Matt Letscher)
Precious Cargo – Jack (Mark-Paul Gosselaar)
Reminiscence – Saint Joe (Daniel Wu)
Rogue One – Orson Krennic (Ben Mendelsohn)
Shades of Blue – Robert Stahl (Warren Kole)
Sputnik – Konstantin (Pyotr Fyodorov)
Stiletto – Lee (Michael Biehn)
The Twilight Zone – Dylan (Luke Kirby)
Wrath of Man – Jackson Ainsley (Jeffrey Donovan)
Zodiac: Signs of the Apocalypse – Neil Martin (Joel Gretsch)

Animation
What If...? – Stephen Strange

References

External links
 Official agency profile 
 

1968 births
Living people
Japanese male television actors
Japanese male video game actors
Japanese male voice actors
Male voice actors from Tokyo
20th-century Japanese male actors
21st-century Japanese male actors
Omega Tribe (Japanese band) members